Peerapat Notchaiya (born 4 February 1993) is a Thai professional footballer who plays as a left back for Thai League 1 club Bangkok United and the Thailand national team.

Club career

Muangthong United
On 27 January 2016 it was announced that Peerapat along with his BEC Tero teammates Tanaboon Kesarat and Chanathip Songkrasin would be joining Muangthong United on loan for the 2016 season.

Career Statistics

International career

Peerapat Notchaiya played for Thailand U19, and played in the 2012 AFC U-19 Championship qualification. 
Peerapat played for Thailand's first team against China, in a friendly match which Thailand won 5-1. 
He represented Thailand U23 in the 2013 Southeast Asian Games. 
He also played for Thailand U23 in the 2014 Asian Games. Peerapat is part of Thailand's squad in the 2014 AFF Suzuki Cup.
In May 2015, he was called up by Thailand to play in the 2018 FIFA World Cup qualification (AFC) against Vietnam.
He won the 2015 Southeast Asian Games with Thailand U23.

Style of Play

Peerapat is known for his powerful long-range shots.

International

International goals

Honours

Club
BEC Tero Sasana
 Thai League Cup (1): 2014
Muangthong United
 Thai League 1 (1): 2016
 Thai League Cup (2): 2016, 2017
 Thailand Champions Cup (1): 2017
 Mekong Club Championship (1): 2017

International
Thailand U-19
 AFF U-19 Youth Championship (1); 2011

Thailand U-23
 Sea Games  Gold Medal (2); 2013, 2015

Thailand
 ASEAN Football Championship (2): 2014, 2016
 King's Cup (2): 2016, 2017

References

External links
Peerapat Notchaiya profile at Muangthong United website

1993 births
Living people
Peerapat Notchaiya
Peerapat Notchaiya
Association football fullbacks
Peerapat Notchaiya
Peerapat Notchaiya
Peerapat Notchaiya
Peerapat Notchaiya
Peerapat Notchaiya
Footballers at the 2014 Asian Games
Peerapat Notchaiya
Southeast Asian Games medalists in football
Competitors at the 2013 Southeast Asian Games
Competitors at the 2015 Southeast Asian Games
Peerapat Notchaiya